State space search is a process used in the field of computer science, including artificial intelligence (AI), in which successive configurations or states of an instance are considered, with the intention of finding a goal state with the desired property.

Problems are often modelled as a state space, a set of states that a problem can be in. The set of states forms a graph where two states are connected if there is an operation that can be performed to transform the first state into the second.

State space search often differs from traditional computer science search methods because the state space is implicit: the typical state space graph is much too large to generate and store in memory.  Instead, nodes are generated as they are explored, and typically discarded thereafter.  A solution to a combinatorial search instance may consist of the goal state itself, or of a path from some initial state to the goal state.

Representation 
In state space search, a state space is formally represented as a tuple , in which:
 is the set of all possible states;
 is the set of possible actions, not related to a particular state but regarding all the state space;
 is the function that establish which action is possible to perform in a certain state;
 is the function that returns the state reached performing action  in state 
 is the cost of performing an action  in state . In many state spaces is a constant, but this is not true in general.

Examples of state-space search algorithms

Uninformed search 
According to Poole and Mackworth, the following are uninformed state-space search methods, meaning that they do not have any prior information about the goal's location.
 Traditional depth-first search
 Breadth-first search
 Iterative deepening
 Lowest-cost-first search / Uniform-cost search (UCS)

These methods take the goal's location in the form of a heuristic function. Poole and Mackworth cite the following examples as informed search algorithms:
 Informed/Heuristic depth-first search
Greedy best-first search
 A* search

See also
 State space
 State space planning
 Branch and bound - a method for making state-space search more efficient by pruning subsets of it.

References

 Stuart J. Russell and Peter Norvig (1995). Artificial Intelligence: A Modern Approach. Prentice Hall.

Search algorithms